Larra anathema is a species of parasitoid wasps belonging to the family Crabronidae. It is the type species of the genus Larra.

Subspecies
 Larra anathema anathema (Rossi, 1790) 
 Larra anathema melanaria Kohl, 1880

Description
The body is mainly black, but the first and second tergite of the abdomen are reddish brown. The wings are dark brown or black. Anteriorly the first antennal segment is reddish.

Biology
The females hunt European mole crickets (Gryllotalpa gryllotalpa) stinging and  paralyzing them. Larvae feed upon their host.

Distribution
This species is widespread in North Africa, in Southern and Central Europe and in Turkey. It has been introduced in Hawaii for biological pest control. These wasps prefer dry habitats.

Bibliography
 Rolf Witt: Wespen. Beobachten, Bestimmen. Naturbuch-Verlag, Augsburg 1998, .

References

External links
 Larra anathema - Biodiversity Heritage Library - Bibliography
 Larra anathema - NCBI Taxonomy Database
 Larra anathema - Global Biodiversity Information Facility
 Larra anathema - Encyclopedia of Life

Crabronidae
Hymenoptera of Africa
Hymenoptera of Asia
Hymenoptera of Europe
Insects described in 1790
Taxa named by Pietro Rossi